Rud is a Persian stringed musical instrument.

Rud or RUD may also refer to:


Geography 
 Khvaf, also called Rūd, a city in Iran
 Rud, Nishapur, a village in Iran

People 
 Anne Rud (died 1533), Danish noble and landholder
 Jon Raahauge Rud (born 1986), Danish swimmer
 Ove Rud (1923–2007), Danish actor
 Otte Rud (1520–1565), Danish admiral  
 Rutherford "Rud" Rennie (1897–1956), American newspaperman and sportswriter
 Rued Langgaard (1893–1952), Danish composer, born Rud Immanuel Langgaard.

Religion 
 Ram and Rud, progenitors of the second generation of humans in Mandaeism

Technology 
 Rapid unscheduled disassembly, an unseemly failure mode, particularly of rocket and space-faring technology

Transportation 
 IATA code for Shahroud Airport
 Rutland station, Vermont, Amtrak rail code

See also
 , a common element in Iranian place names